This list includes Italian American mobsters and organized crime figures by region and by American Mafia organization, both past and present.

New York City

Genovese crime family

Boss/acting boss 
Giuseppe "the Clutch Hand" Morello – boss (1890s–1909)
Nicholas "Nick" Morello – boss (1909–1916) killed in 1916
Vincenzo "Vincent" Terranova – boss (1916–1920)
Giuseppe "Joe the boss" Masseria – boss (1920–1931)
Charlie "Lucky" Luciano – boss (1931–1946)
Frank "The Prime Minister" Costello – acting boss (1936–1945), boss (1946–1957)
"Don" Vito Genovese – underboss (1931–1936), boss (1957–1969)
Anthony "Tony Bender" Strollo – acting boss (1959–1962)
Thomas "Tommy Ryan" Eboli – acting boss (1962–1965)
Frank Tieri – front boss (circa 1972–1981)
Philip Lombardo – boss (1969–1981)
Anthony "Fat Tony" Salerno – front boss (1981–1987)
Vincent "Chin" Gigante – underboss (1981–1987), boss (1981–2005)
Liborio Bellomo – acting boss (1990–1992), street boss (1992–1996), boss (2010-present)
Dominick "Quiet Dom" Cirillo – acting boss (1997–1998)
Matthew "Matty The Horse" Ianniello – acting boss (1997–2005)
Mario Gigante – street boss (2006–2007)
Daniel Leo (mobster) – acting boss (2005–2008)

Underboss/consigliere 
Willie Moretti – underboss, capo
Venero Mangano – underboss, capo
Gerardo Catena – underboss, capo
Saverio Santora – underboss, capo
Michele Miranda – consigliere
Louis Manna – consigliere
James Ida – consigliere
Lawrence Dentico – consigliere

Capo/soldier/associate 
Joe Adonis – capo
Peter DeFeo – capo
Anthony Provenzano – capo
Anthony Strollo – capo
Tino Fiumara – capo
Vincent Alo – capo
Anthony Carfano – capo
Michael Coppola – capo
John Ardito – capo
Angelo DeCarlo – capo
Vincent Cafaro – soldier, government informant (1986)
Joseph Lanza – soldier (circa 1920s–1968)
Joseph Valachi – soldier, government informant
Carmine Romano – soldier

Gambino crime family

Boss/acting boss 
Salvatore "Toto" D'Aquila boss (1916–1928)
Manfredi "Al" Mineo – boss (1928–1930)
Frank Scalice – boss (1930–1931)
Vincent Mangano – boss (1931–1951)
Albert "The Lord High Executioner" Anastasia – boss (1951–1957), underboss (1931–1951)
Carlo "Don Carlo" Gambino – boss (1957–1976), underboss (1957)
Paul "Big Paulie" Castellano – boss (1976–1985)
John "The Teflon Don" Gotti – boss (1985–2002)
Junior Gotti – acting boss (1992–1996, 1997–1999)
Peter Gotti – boss (2002–2011); acting boss (1999–2002)
Arnold Squitieri – acting boss (2002–2005)
Jackie D'Amico – acting boss (2005)
Nicholas Corozzo – acting boss (2005–2008)
Jackie D'Amico – street boss (2008–2011)
Domenico Cefalu – boss (2011–present)
Frank Cali - acting boss (2015–2019)

Underboss/consigliere/capo 
Aniello "Mr. Niel" Dellacroce – underboss (1965–1985)
Frank DeCicco – underboss (1985–1986)
Joseph Armone – underboss (1986–1990), consigliere (1990–1992)
Salvatore "Sammy the Bull" Gravano – underboss (1990–1992), consigliere (1987–1990)- Became a government informant
Thomas Bilotti – underboss (1985)
Frank Locascio – acting underboss (1986–1990), acting consigliere (1990–1992)
Arnold Squitieri – acting boss (2002–2005)
Joseph N. Gallo – consigliere (1957–1986)
Joseph Corozzo – consigliere (1992–present)
Carmine Lombardozzi – capo
Anthony Gaggi – capo
Michael DiLeonardo – capo
Anthony Scotto – capo
Anthony Ciccone – capo
Carmine Fatico – capo
Angelo "Quack Quack" Ruggiero – capo
Nicholas Corozzo – capo
Gene Gotti – capo
John A. Gotti – capo
Richard V. Gotti – capo
Ronnie Trucchio – capo
Salvatore Scala – capo
Salvatore LoCascio – capo
Louis Ricco – capo
James Squillante – capo
James Failla – capo
Thomas Gambino – capo
Stephen Grammauta – capo
George Remini – capo
Jackie D'Amico – capo
Leonard DiMaria – capo
George DeCicco – capo
Thomas Cacciopoli – capo
Robert "DB" DiBernardo – capo
John Gambino – capo
Pasquale Conte – capo

Soldier/associate 
Roy DeMeo – soldier
Anthony Senter – associate
Joseph Paruta – soldier
Joseph Vollaro – associate
Dominick Montiglio – associate

Lucchese crime family

Boss/acting boss 
Gaetano Reina – boss (1916–1930)
Joseph Pinzolo – boss (1930)
Tommaso Gagliano – boss (1930–1951)
Gaetano "Tommy Brown" Lucchese – boss (1951–1967); underboss (1931–1951)
Carmine Tramunti – boss (1967–1974)
Anthony Corallo – boss (1974–1986)
Vic Amuso – boss (1987–2012)
Alphonse D'Arco – acting boss (1990–1991); capo (1988–1991)
Joseph DeFede – acting boss (1994–1998)
Steven Crea – acting boss (1998–2001); underboss (1994–present)
Matthew Madonna – acting boss (2009–2017)

Underboss/consigliere/capo/soldier/associate 
Anthony Casso – underboss (1987–1994)
Salvatore Santoro – underboss (1979–1987)
Joseph Caridi – consigliere (2003–present)
Louis Daidone – consigliere (1993–2003)
Frank Lastorino – consigliere (1989–1993)
Christopher Furnari – consigliere (1974–1987)
Paul Vario – consigliere (1972–1979); capo
Aniello Migliore – capo
Joseph DiNapoli – capo
Joseph Abate – capo
Peter Chiodo – capo
Anthony Accetturo – capo
Salvatore Avellino – capo
Michael Taccetta – capo
Martin Taccetta – capo
Salvatore Avellino – capo
Johnny Dio – capo
Nicodemo "Nicky" Scarfo Jr - capo 
Henry Hill – associate (Irish-Italian)
Thomas "Tommy" DeSimone – associate
Vincent Papa – associate
Anthony Loria Sr. – associate

Bonanno crime family

Boss/acting boss 
Nicolo Schiro – boss (1912–1930)
Vito Bonventre – boss (1930)
Salvatore Maranzano – boss (1930–1931)
Joseph "Don Peppino" Bonanno – boss (1931–1965)
Gaspar DiGregorio – boss (1965–1966)
Paul Sciacca – boss (1966–1971)
Natale Evola – boss (1971–1973); underboss (1968–1971)
Carmine Galante – boss (1975–1979); underboss (1956–1962)
Philip Rastelli – boss (1974–1975), (1979–1991); underboss (1970–1973)
Joseph Massino – acting boss (1982–1987), boss (1991–2004)
Anthony Spero – acting boss (1987–1993)
Vincent Basciano – acting boss (2004–2009)
Salvatore Montagna – acting boss (2006–2009)
Vincent Badalamenti – acting boss (2010–present)

Underboss/consigliere/capo/soldier 
Salvatore Vitale – underboss (1991–2004); became an informant
Nicholas Santora – acting underboss (2005–present)
Anthony Graziano – consigliere (2001–present)
Dominick Napolitano – capo
Alphonse Indelicato – capo
Salvatore Bonanno – consigliere (1964–1966)
Michael Sabella – capo
Philip Giaccone – capo
Dominick Trinchera – capo
Frank Coppa – capo
Anthony Indelicato – capo
Cesare Bonventre – soldier
Benjamin "Lefty Guns" Ruggiero – soldier
Thomas Pitera – soldier
Anthony Mirra – soldier

Colombo crime family

Boss/acting boss 
Joseph Profaci – boss (1931–1961)
Giuseppe Magliocco – underboss (1931–1962), boss (1962–1963)
Joseph Colombo – boss (1963–1971)
Carmine Persico – boss (1971–2019)
Gennaro Langella – acting boss (1981–1984)
Victor Orena – acting boss (1988–1992)
Thomas Gioeli – acting boss (2001–present)
Joel Cacace – acting boss (2000–2004)
Thomas Gioeli – acting boss

Underboss/consigliere/capo/soldier 
John Franzese – underboss (1980–1995)
Gennaro Langella – underboss (1972–1992)
William Cutolo – underboss (1992–1999)
John DeRoss – underboss (1999–2004)
Carmine Sessa – consigliere (1988–1993)
Joel Cacace – consigliere (1996–present)
Charles Panarella – capo
Vincenzo Aloi – capo
Gregory Scarpa Sr. – capo
Gregory Scarpa Jr. - capo
Michael Franzese – capo
Crazy Joe Gallo – soldier
Ralph Scopo – soldier
Joel Cacace – soldier

Chicago

Chicago Outfit

Boss/acting boss
James "Big Jim" Colosimo – boss (1903–1920)
Johnny "The Fox" Torrio – boss (1920–1925)
Al "Scarface" Capone – boss (1925–1931)
Frank "The Enforcer" Nitti – boss (1932–1943)
Paul Ricca – boss (1943–1947)
Tony Accardo – boss (1947–1957)
Sam "The Cigar" Giancana – boss (1957–1966)
Sam Battaglia – boss (1966–1967)
Jackie Cerone – boss (1967–1969)
Felix Alderisio – boss (1969–1971)
Joseph Aiuppa – boss (1971–1986)
Joseph Ferriola – boss (1986–1989)
Samuel Carlisi – boss (1989–1993)
Joseph Lombardo – boss (1993–present)
James Marcello – front boss (2003–2007)
John DiFronzo – official boss (1996-2018)
Salvatore DeLaurentis – acting boss (2014–2018) official boss (2018–present)

Underboss/consigliere/capo
Antonio Lombardo – consigliere (1925–1928)
Jackie Cerone – underboss (1973–1986)
Charles Fischetti – consigliere (1929–1947)
Paul Ricca – consigliere (1947–1957)
 Tony "Joe Batters" Accardo – consigliere (1957–1992)
Joseph Aiuppa – consigliere (1992–1997)
Angelo J. LaPietra – consigliere (1997–1996)
Nicholas Santora – capo
James Torello – capo
Frank Calabrese – capo
Nicholas Calabrese – capo

Soldier/associate's 
Jack McGurn - soldier 
Johnny Roselli - soldier
Tony "The Ant" Spilotro – soldier
Harry Aleman - soldier
Charles Nicoletti - soldier
Victor Spilotro -  soldier
Albert Anselmi - soldier
Sam DeStefano - associate
Michael Spilotro - associate
Frank Cullotta - associate

Milwaukee

Milwaukee crime family

Boss/acting boss 
Frank Balistrieri – boss (1961–1993)

Underboss/consigliere/capo/soldier

Philadelphia

Philadelphia crime family

Boss/acting boss 
Salvatore Sabella – boss (1911–1931)
Joseph Ida – boss (1946–1959)
Antonio Pollina – acting boss (1958–1959)
Angelo Bruno – boss (1959–1980)
Philip Testa – boss (1980–1981)
Nicodemo Scarfo – boss (1981–1991), consigliere (1980–1981)
John Stanfa – boss (1991–1994)
Joseph Merlino – boss (1994–present)
Ralph Natale – front boss (1994–1999)
Joseph Ligambi- acting boss (1999–2014), consigliere (2014-present)

Underboss/consigliere/capo/soldier 

Phil Leonetti – underboss (1986–1989)
Frank Sindone – capo
Salvatore Testa – capo
Harry Riccobene – capo

New Jersey

DeCavalcante crime family

Boss/acting boss 
Sam DeCavalcante – boss (1964–1976)
Giovanni Riggi – boss (1970s–2015)
John D'Amato – acting boss (1991–1992)
Giacomo Amari – acting boss (1992–1994)
Joseph Miranda – acting boss (2003–2006)
Frank Guarraci – acting boss (2006–2016)
Charles Majuri – official boss (2016–present)

Underbosses/consigliere/capo/soldier 
Girolamo Palermo – underboss (1976–1989)
Giacomo Amari – underboss (1989–1994)
Girolamo Palermo – underboss (1994–2000)
Joseph Miranda – acting underboss (2003–2005) official underboss (2007–unknown)
Frank Guarraci – capo
Joseph Miranda – capo
Gaetano Vastola – acting underboss (1990–1991)
Vincent Palermo – capo
Girolamo Palermo – capo
Giuseppe Schifilliti – capo
Philip Abramo – capo
Anthony Capo – soldier
Louis Consalvo – soldier

New England

Patriarca crime family

Boss/acting boss 
Gaspare Messina – boss (1916–1924)
Raymond L.S. Patriarca – underboss (1938–1952), boss (1952–1984)
Nicholas Bianco – underboss (1990–1991), boss (1991)
Frank Salemme – boss (1991–2000)
Luigi Mannochio – boss (2000-present)

Underboss/consigliere/capo/soldier/associate 
Enrico Tameleo – underboss (1952–1968)
Matthew Guglielmetti – capo (1991–present)
Vincent Ferrara – capo (1986–1989)
Robert Carrozza – capo
Ilario Zannino – consigliere (1984–1987)
Angelo Mercurio – soldier
Angiulo Brothers

Detroit

Detroit Partnership

Boss/acting boss 
Salvatore Catalanotte – boss (1921–1930)
Gaspar Milazzo – boss (1930)
Cesare Lamare – boss (1930–1931)
William Tocco – boss (1931–1936)
Joseph Zerilli – boss (1936–1977)
Jack Tocco – boss (1977–2014)

Underboss/consigliere 
Anthony Joseph Zerilli – underboss (1977–2015)
William Tocco – underboss (1936–1963)
Angelo Meli – consigliere (1950s-1969)

Buffalo

Buffalo crime family

Boss/acting boss 
Stefano Magaddino – boss (1922–1974)
Joseph Todaro Sr. – boss (1984–2006)
Joseph Todaro Jr. – boss (2006–present); acting boss (1995–2006)

Pittsburgh

Pittsburgh crime family
Frank Amato – boss (1937–1956)
John Sebastian LaRocca – boss (1956–1978)
Michael James Genovese – boss (1978–1984)

Cleveland

Cleveland crime family
Joseph Lonardo – boss (1920–1929)
Salvatore Todaro – boss (1927–1929)
Frank Milano – boss (1930–1935)
Alfred Polizzi – boss (1936–1945)
John T. Scalish – boss (1945–1976)
James Licavoli – boss (1976–1985)
John Tronolone – boss (1988-2013)

Northeastern Pennsylvania, Upstate New York

Bufalino crime family
Giacomo "John" Sciandra – boss (1933–1940)
Giuseppe Barbara Sr. – boss (1940–1959)
Russell Bufalino – boss (1959–1990)
William D'Elia – boss (1994–2008)

Los Angeles

Los Angeles crime family

Boss/acting boss 
Vito Di Giorgio – boss (1909–1922)
Rosario DeSimone – boss (1922–1925)
Joseph Ardizzone – boss (1925–1931)
Jack Dragna – boss (1931–1957)
Frank DeSimone – boss (1957–1967)
Nick Licata – boss (1967–1974)
Dominic Brooklier – boss (1974–1984)
Jimmy Fratianno – acting boss (1975–1977)

Underboss/consigliere/capo 
Simone Scozzari – underboss (1956–1962)
Joseph Dippolito – underboss (1967–1974)
Carmen Milano – underboss (1984–2006)
Tom Dragna – consigliere (1931–1956)
Frank Bompensiero – capo (1933–1977)
Louis Tom Dragna – capo (1947–1985)
Jimmy Caci – capo (late 1970s–2011)
Mike Rizzitello - capo (1977-1990)

Cohen crime family
Johnny Stompanato - (1947-1952)

Seattle

Seattle crime family

Frank Colacurcio - boss (1950s-2000s)

St. Louis

St. Louis crime family
Anthony Giordano – boss (1960–1980)
Giovanni Vitale Jr. – acting boss (1975–1980)
Matthew Trupiano – boss (1982–1997)

Kansas City

Kansas City crime family
Charles Binaggio – boss
Nicholas Civella – boss
Carl Civella – boss
Peter Simone – underboss 
William Cammisano – boss 
Anthony Civella – boss

New Orleans

New Orleans crime family
Sylvestro "Silver Dollar Sam" Carolla
Frank Todaro
Carlos Marcello

Tampa

Trafficante crime family
Boss
 Ignazio Antinori – (boss 1920–1940)
 Santo Trafficante Sr. – (boss 1940–1954)
 Santo Trafficante Jr. – (boss 1954–1987) 
 Vincent LoScalzo – (boss 1987–present)  

Associate
 Frank Ragano

See also
 List of Italian American mobsters
 List of Mafia crime families
 List of American mobsters by organization
 List of criminal enterprises, gangs and syndicates

References

American Mafia
Mobster